Parliamentary elections were held in Ukraine on 26 March 2006. Election campaigning officially began on 7 July 2005. Between November 26 and 31 December 2005 party lists of candidates were formed.

The election to the Ukrainian parliament, Verkhovna Rada, was held according to the party-list proportional election system—that is, in a single nationwide electoral district with votes being allocated to the political parties or election blocs rather than to individual candidates. In the previous parliamentary elections half of parliamentary representatives (deputies) were elected on proportional basis, while the other half were elected in single-mandate constituencies.

Following the Orange Revolution and the 2004 presidential elections in December 2004 Ukrainian parliament adopted significant changes (amendments) to the Constitution of Ukraine by introducing concepts of political coalition, coalition government, imperative mandate as well as transferred some power from the President to the parliament, making Ukraine a parliamentary-presidential democracy. Those amendments were to enter into force on 1 January 2006. The new constitutional amendment also abolished single member-districts and replacing them with an increased multi-member proportional representation. According to the election law and the system adopted, the political parties or election blocs need to collect at least 3% of the national vote in order to gain seats in parliament.

Parties and electoral blocs registered
A record number of forty five parties registered for the election, with only five securing the minimum 3% quota required to elect representatives to the Ukrainian parliament. Seats in the Verkhovna Rada are allocated among those parties securing the 3% quota according to the largest remainder method of seat allocation, using the Hare quota. Each party meeting the 3% quota is entitled to appoint one representative for every 1/450 (approximately 0.22%) of the total vote allocated to all parties exceeding the 3% threshold, with remaining seats being awarded to the parties with the largest remaining fractions of 1/450 of the total vote allocated to all parties meeting the 3% threshold.

Name of the party or electoral bloc (number of candidates):

(Parties or blocs which have obtained at least 3% of the vote are in bold)

Communist Party of Ukraine (449)
Party of Regions (446)
People's Movement of Ukraine for Unity (42)
Party of Social Protection (20)
Political Party "European Capital" (35)
Nataliya Vitrenko Bloc "People's Opposition" (390)
Party "Rus'-Ukrainian Union"
Progressive Socialist Party of Ukraine
All-Ukrainian Party of People's Trust (41)
Lazarenko Bloc (130)
Party "Social Democratic Union"
Political Party All-Ukrainian Union "Hromada"
Social Democratic Party of Ukraine
Bloc "Our Ukraine" (393)
Congress of Ukrainian Nationalists
People's Movement of Ukraine
Party of Industrialists and Entrepreneurs of Ukraine
Party of Christian Democratic Union
Political Party People's Union Our Ukraine
Ukrainian Republican Party "Assembly"
Lytvyn's People's Bloc (444)
People's Party
Party of All-Ukrainian Union of the Left "Justice"
Ukrainian Peasant Democratic Party
Party of National Economic Development of Ukraine (24)
Yuliya Tymoshenko Bloc (409)
All-Ukrainian Union "Fatherland"
Ukrainian Social-Democratic Party
Socialist Party of Ukraine (390)
Electoral Bloc "Yevhen Marchuk - "Unity" (82)
Party of Freedom
Party "Solidarity of Women of Ukraine"
Ukrainian Party "Unity"
Electoral Bloc of Political Parties of Borys Olijnyk and Myhailo Syrota (99)
Political Party "Informational Ukraine"
Political Party "Party of Health"
Labor Party of Ukraine
"Oppositional bloc NE TAK!" (NOT YES!) (441)
Social Democratic Party of Ukraine (united)
Republican Party of Ukraine
"Women for the Future" All-Ukrainian Political Union
Political Party "All-Ukrainian Union "Center"
Ukrainian People's Bloc of Kostenko and Plyusch (216)
Party of Free Peasants and Entrepreneurs of Ukraine
Political Party "Collected Ukraine"
Ukrainian People's Party
Party of Greens of Ukraine (87)
Block of People's Democratic Parties (376)
Democratic Party of Ukraine
People's Democratic Party
Christian Democratic Party of Ukraine
Christian Liberal Party of Ukraine
Party "Viche" (58)
Social Christian Party (36)
Ukrainian Conservative Party (31)
Party of Pensioners of Ukraine (93)
Political party "Forwards, Ukraine!" (77)
"Electoral bloc "State - Labor Union" (263)
All-Ukrainian Party of Laborious
Political Party "State"
Electoral bloc of political parties "FOR UNION" (83)
Party "Socialist Ukraine"
Party "Union"
Political Party "Homeland"
Slavic Party
Party "Renassainse" (86)
Political Party "Working Ukraine" (20)
Ukrainian Party "Green Planet" (28)
Electoral Bloc "Power to the People" (173)
All-Ukrainian Party of Spirituality and Patriotism
All-Ukrainian Chernobyl People's Party "For Welfare and Social Protection of the People"
Party of Protection of Pensioners of Ukraine
All-Ukrainian Party "New Force" (185)
"Civil Bloc PORA-PRP" (244)
Civil Party "PORA"
Party "Reforms and Order"
Liberal Party of Ukraine (43)
Political Party of Ukraine "Party of PUTIN's Politics" (162)
Social Ecological Party "Union. Chernobyl. Ukraine." (54)
Bloc "Patriots of Ukraine" (99)
Patriotic Party of Ukraine
Ukrainian National Conservative Party
"Yuriy Karmazin Bloc" (59)
All-Ukrainian Party of Peace and Unity
Party of Defenders of Homeland
Party "National Democratic Union "Ukraine"
Party of Patriotic Forces of Ukraine (103)
Political Party "Party of Ecological Rescue "EKO+25%" (140)
Political Party Third Force (208)
Ukrainian People's Assembly (22)
All-Ukrainian Union "Freedom" (109)
Peasant Party of Ukraine (65)
Bloc of Partyless "Sun" (129)
Ukrainian Party of Honor, Combating Corruption, and Organized Crime (44)

Opinion polls
According to earlier polls, front-runners where Party of Regions on 34%, Yulia Tymoshenko Bloc on 24%, as well as President Yushchenko's People's Union Our Ukraine.

Two other political forces that where virtually assured to pass a 3% barrier where the Socialist Party of Ukraine headed by Oleksander Moroz and the bloc of the current Speaker of Verkhovna Rada, Volodymyr Lytvyn (based on his former Agrarian Party of Ukraine renamed to the People's Party).

The Communist Party of Ukraine, which has progressively received fewer and fewer votes with each election (25% in 1998, 20% in 2002), was expected to continue their decline in voter support.

Whilst some parties have nominated over 400 candidates, it was always unlikely that any single Party would elect over 200 members. In order to form a Government, under Ukraine's constitution, parties will need to form a coalition with two or more voting blocks within the first month following the declaration of the polls.

Razumkov Centre Poll
Each 2 weeks Razumkov Centre held a representative national survey.

Table 1 shows the results for the parties likely to pass the three percent threshold.

The latest Razumkov poll shows a consolidation of voter opinion and if the results of the poll are a true indication of voter intention the voter participation rate will be above 90% of registered voters. Voting in Ukraine is not compulsory. Votes below the 3% threshold are discarded which increases the proportional share of seats allocated to the remaining party/blocs. There is still 10.5% of voters undecided.

Kyiv International Institute of Sociology
Kyiv International Institute of Sociology presented the latest poll on 9 February based on a survey during 20–27 January.

Table 2 shows the Kyiv International Institute of Sociology (KIIS) poll results for the parties likely to pass the three percent threshold.

The map to the right shows the non administrative regional division used by KIIS: The Western region (orange) comprises the eight oblasts of the west - Volyn, Rivne, Lviv, Ivano-Frankivsk, Ternopil, Khmelnytskyi, Transcarpathia, and Chernivtsi oblasts; the Central region (yellow) is made up by Zhytomyr, Vinnytsia, Kirovohrad, Cherkasy, Poltava, Sumy, Chernihiv and Kyiv oblasts as well as the city of Kyiv; the Southern region (light blue) consists of Dnipropetrovsk, Odessa, Mykolayiv, Kherson, Zaporizhzhia oblasts, the Autonomous Republic of Crimea and the city of Sevastopol; the Eastern region (dark blue) includes Kharkiv, Donetsk and Luhansk oblasts

Exit polls

Source: Korrespondent.net

Results
On 10 April the Central Election Commission (CVK) announced the final results of vote counting. Out of 45 parties, only 5 passed the required 3% electoral threshold (see the table below).

Comparing the results with early polls (but not with 2005 opinion polls), it was unexpected that President Viktor Yushchenko's party  "Our Ukraine" received less than 14% of the national vote, coming third after the Party of Regions, and the Yulia Tymoshenko Bloc. 

As per preliminary results, the Ukrainian Communist Party was soundly trounced, getting less than 4% of the vote and 21 deputies as a result, as opposed to their 20% in the 2002 elections.

The People's Opposition Bloc of Natalia Vitrenko did not pass the electoral threshold collecting only 2.93% of total votes recorded, 0.07% short of the required 3% electoral threshold. According to the law the threshold is calculated based on the total number of the voted ballots, including the general non-confidence votes (i.e. ballots of those who voted against all parties listed) as well as invalid votes (e.g. votes for more than one party as such option is not provided by electoral law). If such votes were excluded from the total, then Vitrenko party would have received over 3% of the formal vote. Commenting the preliminary results the leader of the Opposition Bloc, Natalia Vitrenko expressed: "Based on what grounds CVK shows the total number of actual voters as 25,250 thousands? According to CVK data, 2% of votes are invalid, and 1.8% are "against all", therefore these numbers should be excluded. The base for calculations should not be more than 24,500 thousand; and that is 3% out of the votes that CVK counted for out Bloc." Nonetheless, according to the Law on Election, Article 1.4 "The mandates are distributed to the parties (blocs) that obtained no less than three percent of votes of voters that participated in the election"

A set of parties which did not pass the electoral threshold, notably People's Opposition Bloc of Natalia Vitrenko and the Opposition Bloc "Ne Tak" have made claims of the elections being highly falsified and asked for vote recount. Recent reports in the media have indicated that Ukraine's President has also suggested that if necessary a partial recount of the 26 March ballot should be made. If significant mistakes were made in the tally of votes there is a chance for Opposition Block of Natalia Vitrenko to exceed the 3% threshold required by law.

Over 22% of voters who supported minor candidates (with less than the 3%) will not be represented by the parties elected due to the electoral method used (party list proportional representation with an election threshold).

Maps

Reactions
According to Arabic newsmedia Al Jazeera, Party of the regions had alleged that the general elections had been marred by irregularities and poor organisation as the first exit polls were published. But while acknowledging some organisational problems, most other parties and Western observers have given the vote a largely clean bill of health. 

Russian newspaper Izvestia predicts that Ukraine can expect more political instability and worsening economic situation. 

According to Russian online newspaper Gazeta.Ru, Tymoshenko, Yushchenko and the Socialists can form a coalition. Yulia Tymoshenko was sure she will become a new PM. Yushchenko and Georgian President Saakishvili already congratulated her with victory. ,,

According to Russian news agency RIA Novosti, Tymoshenko promised to reconsider the Russian-Ukrainian gas deal. 

The Washington Post informed that Yushchenko's party was beaten into a humiliating third place in parliamentary elections as the pro-Russian party of the man he defeated for the presidency 16 months ago appeared headed for a clear victory, according to exit polls. The Party of Regions, led by Viktor Yanukovych, who was defeated by Yushchenko in 2004 following massive street protests known as the Orange Revolution, secured a commanding 33.3 percent of the vote, according to one poll. A second exit poll gave his party 27.5 percent. 

On 27 March, Arabic Al Jazeera reported that Yulia Tymoshenko, the former PM, had scored a triumph in parliamentary elections with her own bloc coming second and placing her in a position to form a coalition government. Viktor Yanukovich's pro-Russian Regions party won the most seats, but Tymoshenko emerged as a rejuvenated political figure, saying that "Orange Revolution" liberals could close ranks to keep the pro-Russian party in opposition. The outcome was a double humiliation for Viktor Yushchenko, the president, who defeated Yanukovich in a presidential poll re-run after December's 2004 street protests, and later fell out with Tymoshenko, his former Orange Revolution comrade. 

According to Forbes, Tymoshenko urged her estranged Orange Revolution allies to form a united front against their old pro-Russian nemesis, who was leading in early results from a weekend parliamentary election. Proposed coalition talks, which were supposed to get under way Monday, were delayed indefinitely.

Russian online newspaper Lenta.ru reported that activists of Vitrenko's party erected tents and started boycotting the premises of Ukrainian Central Election Commission in protest of alleged violations. . According to Ukrainian news agency Interfax-Ukraine and Ukrainian online newspaper Ukrayinska Pravda the tents are mostly empty.

Government formation

Following the 2004 constitutional amendments, a concept of coalition government replaced the existing concept of majority government.

The formation of coalition government was delayed and triggered post-election political "trade offs". On 22 June 2006 there finally was signed a coalition agreement between Bloc of Yulia Tymoshenko, Bloc "Our Ukraine", and the Socialist Party of Ukraine forming the Coalition of Democratic Forces. However, political trading continued on and appointment of new government was getting suspended. Because of delay, the Socialist Party withdrew its signature from the coalition agreement and on 7 July 2006 signed new coalition agreement with the Party of Regions and the Communist Party of Ukraine forming the so-called Alliance of National Unity. That led to re-appointment of Viktor Yanukovych as Prime Minister on 4 August, with the backing of 30 deputies of the "Our Ukraine" Bloc, after the parties agreed on the principals of state policy expressed in the Universal of National Unity.

The political scandal led to early parliamentary elections after the President Viktor Yushchenko dissolved the parliament.

References

Razumkov Centre: 21 листопада 2005 Рейтинг політичних партій України (Центр ім.О. Разумков) (Conducted 3–13 November 2005, published 21 November 2005, Ukrainian only, edited)
Razumkov Centre: 20 січня 2006 Електоральні рейтинги партій і блоків (Центр ім.О. Разумков) (Conducted 12–17 January 2006, published 20 January, Ukrainian only, edited)
Razumkov Centre: 8 лютого 2006 Наміри голосування на виборах до Верховної Ради України та ідеологічні орієнтації громадян (Центр ім.О. Разумков) (Conducted 26–31 January 2006, published 8 February, Ukrainian only, edited)
The November survey included Vitrenko's Progressive Socialist Party of Ukraine. In January it was replaced with Nataliya Vitrenko Bloc "People's Opposition", which also includes the Party "Rus'-Ukrainian Union" (RUS')
Kyiv International Institute of Sociology:Report Documentation Link

External links

 2006 Parliament Election: Official website of the Central Election Commission of Ukraine
Serhiy Vasylchenko: Electoral Geography of Ukraine 1991 - 2010
 OSCE Project Co-ordinator in Ukraine website
 Short film: AEGEE's Election Observation Mission
 Findings from an IFES November 2005 Survey 2
 Review of the most recent polls as of November 3, 2005
 Additional polls

Parliamentary elections in Ukraine
Ukraine
Parliamentary election
Ukraine
5th Ukrainian Verkhovna Rada